Joshua Davidson is an American rabbi.  In 2013 he became rabbi of one of America's preeminent congregations, Congregation Emanu-El of New York.

Davidson is the son of Rabbi Jerome Davidson, the long-serving rabbi of Temple Beth-El (Great Neck, New York), where Joshua Davidson was born and reared.  Before moving to Temple Emmanu-el, Davidson served as rabbi of Temple Beth-El of Chappaqua, New York.  Before Chappaqua, Davidson was assistant rabbi at New York's Central Synagogue.

According to the New York Times, Rabbi Davidson has broken with a longstanding aspect of Temple Emanu-El adherence to the older, Classical expression of Reform Judaism by wearing a kippah and tallit.

References

Living people
Rabbis from New York (state)
Year of birth missing (living people)
21st-century American Jews